Mariana Lengyel (née Ionescu; born 14 April 1953) is a Romanian female former track and field athlete who competed in the discus throw. She was a three-time national champion, winning from 1987 to 1989. She represented her country at the 1987 World Championships in Athletics, finishing in eighth place.

She was bronze medallist on home turf in Bucharest at the 1981 Summer Universiade. Her personal best  was achieved in 1986 and ranked her fifth globally that year. As of 2018, she ranks in the all-time top 40 for the event.

International competitions

National titles
 Romanian Athletics Championships
 Discus throw: 1987, 1988, 1989

References

External links
 

Living people
1953 births
Romanian female discus throwers
World Athletics Championships athletes for Romania
Universiade bronze medalists for Romania
Universiade medalists in athletics (track and field)
Medalists at the 1981 Summer Universiade